The 2021–22 FIS Ski Jumping World Cup was the 43rd World Cup season in ski jumping for men, the 25th official World Cup season in ski flying, and the 11th World Cup season for women. The men's season started in November in Nizhny Tagil, Russia and concluded in March in Planica, Slovenia. The women's season started in December in Lillehammer, Norway and was expected to conclude in March in Chaykovsky, Russia. Because of the Russian invasion of Ukraine, the women’s season concluded in Oberhof, Germany.

Norwegian Halvor Egner Granerud and Slovenian Nika Križnar were the defending overall champions from the 2020–21 season.

The 1st edition of new year's "Silvester Tournament" (women's version of Four Hills Tournament) was held with two K.O. events from 31 December to 1 January in Ljubno, Slovenia. The "Alpenkrone" (Crown of the Alps) tournament - consisting of one competition in Ramsau and two in Hinzenbach - also makes its debut in the women's competition.

As of this season, the mixed competition on the large hill is making its debut.

Fatih Arda İpcioğlu became the first Turkish ski jumper in history of World Cup who managed to qualify to the main competition at the season opener in Nizhni Tagil. He also became the first representative of Turkey to qualify for a competition at the Four Hills Tournament and the first to score World Cup points.

Karl Geiger became the third ski jumper in history to win the final of the previous season and the opening of a new one (after Espen Bredesen in 1992–93 and 1993–94 and Matti Hautamäki in 2002–03 and 2003–04).

After his 12th win in an individual competition in Nizhni Tagil, Halvor Egner Granerud has the most wins of any Norwegian in the World Cup ever. The Norwegian is also the first jumper in World Cup history who could not qualify for two consecutive competitions (Ruka) after winning a competition (Nizhny Tagil).

Marita Kramer won the individual competition on November 26 with the biggest lead over the second athlete (Ema Klinec) in the history of the FIS Women's' World Cup with 41,7 points.

For the first time since the 1983–84 season, six different athletes won the first six men's individual competitions.

After the competition in Innsbruck was cancelled, for the second time in the 70-year history of the Four Hills Tournament will be held on three hills. The previous situation was in the 2007–08 season.

For the first time ever, the Raw Air tournament consists of more competitions for women than for men.

On 1 March 2022, following the 2022 Russian invasion of Ukraine, FIS decided to exclude athletes from Russia and Belarus from FIS competitions, with an immediate effect.

Map of world cup hosts  
All 21 locations hosting world cup events for men (16), for women (9) and shared (6) in this season.

Men 
World Cup history in real time

after FH event in Planica (27 March 2022)

Calendar

Men's team 
World Cup history in real time

after FH event in Planica (26 March 2022)

Standings

Overall

Nations Cup

Prize money

Ski Flying

Four Hills Tournament

Raw Air

Planica7

Women 
World Cup history in real time

after NH event in Oberhof (13 March 2022)

Calendar

Women's team 
World Cup history in real time

after NH event in Hinzenbach (25 February 2022)

Standings

Overall

Nations Cup

Prize money

Silvester Tournament

Alpenkrone

Raw Air

Mixed team 
World Cup history in real time

after LH event in Oslo (4 March 2022)

Podium table by nation 
Table showing the World Cup podium places (gold–1st place, silver–2nd place, bronze–3rd place) by the countries represented by the athletes.

Points distribution 
The table shows the number of points won in the 2021/22 FIS Ski Jumping World Cup for men and women.

Qualifications 
In case the number of participating athletes is 50 (men) / 40 (women) or lower, a Prologue competition round must be organized. In the Women's Silvester Tournament qualifies 50 jumpers.

Men

Women

Achievements 
First World Cup career victory 

Men
 Anže Lanišek (25), in his 9th season – the WC 4 in Ruka
 Jan Hörl (23), in his 4th season – the WC 5 in Wisła
 Daniel Huber (29), in his 7th season – the WC 13 in Bischofshofen
 Žiga Jelar (24), in his 6th season – the WC 27 in Planica

Women
 Ema Klinec (23), in her 8th season – the WC 2 in Nizhny Tagil
 Urša Bogataj (26), in her 11th season – the WC 12 in Hinzenbach
 Silje Opseth (22), in her 7th season – the WC 16 in Oslo

First World Cup podium 

Men
 Lovro Kos (22), in his 2nd season – the WC 11 in Garmisch-Partenkirchen – 3rd place
 Cene Prevc (25), in his 8th season – the WC 19 in Willingen – 3rd place

Women
 Aleksandra Kustova (23), in her 7th season – the WC 11 in Willingen – 3rd place
 Lisa Eder (20), in her 5th season – the WC 12 in Hinzenbach – 3rd place
 Joséphine Pagnier (19), in her 4th season – the WC 13 in Hinzenbach – 3rd place

Number of wins this season (in brackets are all-time wins) 

Men
 Ryōyū Kobayashi – 8 (27)
 Marius Lindvik – 5 (8)
 Stefan Kraft – 4 (25)
 Karl Geiger – 4 (13)
 Halvor Egner Granerud – 2 (13)
 Daniel-André Tande – 1 (8)
 Timi Zajc – 1 (2)
 Anže Lanišek – 1 (1)
 Jan Hörl – 1 (1)
 Daniel Huber – 1 (1)
 Žiga Jelar – 1 (1)

Women
 Marita Kramer – 7 (15)
 Sara Takanashi – 3 (63) 
 Nika Križnar – 3 (5)
 Urša Bogataj – 3 (3)
 Katharina Althaus – 1 (8)
 Ema Klinec – 1 (1)
 Silje Opseth – 1 (1)

Retirements 
The following notable ski jumpers retired during or after the 2021–22 season:

Men
 Andreas Alamommo
 Thomas Diethart
 Richard Freitag
 Severin Freund
 Claudio Haas
 Daiki Itō
 Alexander Yigermal Roeshol Johnson 
 Arkadiusz Jojko
 Čestmír Kožíšek
 Marinus Kraus
 Jonathan Learoyd
 Kilian Märkl
 Anton Oeyvindsson 
 Viktor Polášek
 Cene Prevc
   Andreas Schuler
 Adrian Sell
 Anže Semenič
 Markus Schiffner
 Cedrik Weigel
 Julian Wienerroither 

Women
 Jerneja Brecl
 Susanna Forsström
 Océane Avocat Gros
 Park Guy-lim 
 Yurika Hirayama
 Kaori Iwabuchi 
 Nina Lussi 
 Štěpánka Ptáčková
 Špela Rogelj
 Misaki Shigeno
 Joanna Szwab
 Carina Vogt
 Virág Vörös

See also
2021 FIS Ski Jumping Grand Prix
2021–22 FIS Ski Jumping Continental Cup
2021–22 FIS Cup (ski jumping)

Notes

References 

FIS Ski Jumping World Cup
World cup
World cup